The 1935–36 NCAA men's basketball season began in December 1935, progressed through the regular season and conference tournaments, and concluded in March 1936.

Rule changes
A new rule prohibited any offensive player with the ball from standing in the free-throw lane (also known as the "key") for more than three seconds. Previously, this rule had applied only to a player who had possession of the ball.

Season headlines 

 In February 1943, the Helms Athletic Foundation retroactively selected Notre Dame as its national champion for the 1935–36 season.
 In 1995, the Premo-Porretta Power Poll retroactively selected Long Island as its national champion for the 1935–36 season.

Conference membership changes

Regular season

Conference winners and tournaments

Statistical leaders

Awards

Consensus All-American team

Major player of the year awards 

 Helms Player of the Year: John Moir, Notre Dame (retroactive selection in 1944)

Other major awards 

 Haggerty Award (Top player in New York City metro area): Jules Bender, Long Island

Coaching changes

References